Dragonfly is a 2002 supernatural thriller film directed by Tom Shadyac from a screenplay by Brandon Camp, Mike Thompson, and David Seltzer based on a story by Camp and Thompson. It was produced by Gary Barber, Roger Birnbaum, Mark Johnson, and Shadyac. It stars Kevin Costner as a grieving doctor being contacted by his dead wife through his patients' near-death experiences. It was panned by critics and a box office failure, grossing $52.3 million against its $60 million production budget.

Plot
Joe and Emily Darrow are doctors in a Chicago hospital. Seven months pregnant Emily travels to Venezuela to help natives in the Amazon area. She dies when a bus is hit by a landslide and plunges into the river below. Her body is never found by the local authorities.

Without taking time to grieve Joe returns to work. One night he is awakened by his wife's dragonfly paper weight that falls and rolls across the room. His wife always had a passion for dragonflies and even had a birthmark on her shoulder which resembled a dragonfly. Joe starts visiting Emily's patients at the pediatric oncology unit in the hospital. One of his wife's patients is brought in unconscious. Joe hears the child calling his name and follows the staff who are trying to revive him without success - the child's heart flatlines. As Joe approaches the child, suddenly the heart begins beating again.

The following afternoon Joe returns to the child who asks him if he is "Emily's Joe" and tells him she sent him back to tell Joe something. All over the room are drawings of a curvy cross, but the boy doesn't know what the symbol means. The boy tells about his near death experience, that he saw a light, and a woman showing him an image of Joe, and that the cross symbol was what he saw at the end of the rainbow.  Later, while passing by another child's room, Joe sees the same drawing. That boy immediately knows who Joe is and tells him that he must "go to the rainbow".

When Joe arrives at home, his parrot mysteriously goes into a rage, breaking a pot and making the same wavy cross symbol drawn in the spilled soil on the floor. Joe spots a dragonfly flying outside the window, and briefly sees Emily reaching for him outside that same window. Joe's neighbour, Miriam Belmont, tries to talk him back into reality. Instead, he goes to Sister Madeline, a controversial nun who investigated near-death experiences. Sister Madeline advises Joe that Emily is indeed trying to contact him from the other side.

The breaking point occurs at the hospital when Joe is alone with a clinically dead patient. Joe hears his wife speaking through the patient, calling his name, but no one believes him. He decides to sell his home and go on vacation. While packing away his wife's belongings, the lightbulb in the room burns out. When he returns with a new bulb, all the belongings he had packed away are suddenly back in their original places. He enters his kitchen where a map has blown open, showing the mysterious curvy cross symbol at several places. He learns from a friend that the wiggly cross is the map symbol for a waterfall. Joe remembers and finds a photo of his wife posing in front of a waterfall with a rainbow behind her.

He takes a trip to the South American area where his wife died. Joe's pilot, Victor, takes him to the victims' graves near a tribe village. Joe shows the photo of his wife and asks his native guides if they know where his wife is buried. They start arguing with each other that he should be brought to the village. Joe's attention then shifts to the village and he runs off to it. He comes to a cliff and sees the bus far down below in the water. Joe jumps into the river and enters the semi-flooded bus, causing the bus to shift and become completely submerged. Joe is trapped inside but calms down when a bright glow fills the bus and his wife appears to him, reaching for his hand. The events of her final hours flash before him, showing she survived the initial accident and was pulled to safety by nearby Yanomami villagers. He is then suddenly rescued from the bus by Victor.

Joe runs to the village and is surrounded by angry native men with weapons. He holds up a photo of his wife. A native woman tells him they couldn't save her body but they saved her soul. Perplexed, he follows her into one of the huts, and inside is a female infant in a basket, the child his wife was carrying, who survived the accident. The woman shows him a birthmark on the child in the shape of a dragonfly. As he embraces his daughter he realizes what his wife was trying to tell him.

The film finishes with Joe playing with his daughter, now a toddler with wavy blonde hair, the very image of his wife.

Cast
 Kevin Costner as Dr. Joe Darrow
 Susanna Thompson as Dr. Emily Darrow
 Joe Morton as Hugh Campbell
 Ron Rifkin as Charlie Dickinson
 Kathy Bates as Miriam Belmont
 Linda Hunt as Sister Madeline
 Jacob Vargas as Victor
 Robert Bailey, Jr. as Jeffrey Reardon
 Jay Thomas as Hal
 Matt Craven as Eric
 Lisa Banes as Flora
 Casey Biggs as Neil Darrow
 Leslie Hope as Charisse Darrow
 Peter Hansen as Phillip Darrow

Production
The project was initially set up at MGM when the script was bought for a mid six figures outbidding Touchstone. The script was put into turnaround when MGM grew uncertain of the $75 million dollar budget with Shady Acres Entertainment reacquiring the domestic distribution rights that in turn were acquired by Universal while Spyglass Entertainment handled foreign pre-sales in a manner similar to the arrangement with The Sixth Sense whose success helped give Dragonfly the traction it needed to move into production. Kevin Costner entered negotiations to star in September 2000.

Release
Produced on a $60 million budget, Dragonfly made $52 million worldwide.

Home media
The film was released on DVD on 30 July 2002 by Universal Studios Home Video.

Reception
Rotten Tomatoes, a review aggregator, reports that 7% of 125 critics gave the film a positive review; the average rating is 3.65/10.  The consensus reads: "Sappy, dull and muddled, Dragonfly is too melancholic and cliched to generate much suspense." On Metacritic it carries the score of 25 out of 100, indicating "Generally unfavorable reviews".

Remake
An Indian re-make was made of this film by the name Saaya in 2003.

References

External links
 
 

2002 films
2002 fantasy films
American science fiction films
American romance films
Films about widowhood
Films shot in Chicago
Films set in Chicago
Films set in Venezuela
Films shot in Venezuela
American ghost films
Spyglass Entertainment films
Universal Pictures films
Films scored by John Debney
Films directed by Tom Shadyac
Films produced by Roger Birnbaum
2000s English-language films
2000s American films